Lennart Pettersson is a retired Swedish footballer. Pettersson made 20 Allsvenskan appearances for Djurgården and scored 1 goal.

References

Swedish footballers
Allsvenskan players
Djurgårdens IF Fotboll players
Association footballers not categorized by position
Year of birth missing